San Martín de Chacas is a Peruvian town, capital of the eponymous district and the Asunción Province, located in the east-central region of Ancash. It has an urban population of 2,082 located at 3,359 meters; and a district of 5,334 people. The district, located in the sub-basin of the Marañon River, has an area of 447.69 km², which represents 85% of the province.

Chacas was founded in the 1570s, but it is known that the territory now covered by the province to which it belongs, together with the provinces of Huari and Carlos Fermín Fitzcarrald, are the most remote evidence of human presence in the Eastern Sierra Ancash, represented by the findings of caves and rock shelters prior to the Chavin culture. The ethnic group that was present in this place after the fall of the Chavin culture was the lordship of Huari.

The city is characterized for having remained unchanged over the original Andean-Andalusian architecture, with narrow streets, houses adorned with double water carved balconies and gates, made by craftsmen Don Bosco, whom Fr. Ugo de Censi, Operation Mato Grosso (with Chacas as a hub) and italian residents for thirty years, took charge of rebuilding the shrine Mama Ashu and restoration of the baroque altarpiece dating from the 17th century. There is now developing artwork for export to Europe and the United States, in addition to the unique stained glass factory in South America, having played an essiental role in the development of the city.

During the festivities in honor of the Assumption of the Virgin Mary, the bullfight and the Race To Tapes are held in the main square; has Mozo Danza ritual dance, Dance Cultural Heritage of the Nation and the Provincial Museum exhibits an extensive collection of pre-Columbian pieces.

Toponymy 
There are two versions about the meaning of the name:
 It comes from the Quechua word chaka that can be translated into Spanish as a bridge, for it is based on the argument that all roads in and out of people always crossing bridges.
 It comes from the Quechua word chaga meaning Atalaya, on the basis that Chacas imedia of more than 6 pirushtus.

Geography

Location 

Chacas district is located in the eastern slope of the White Mountains in the buffer zone of the Huascarán National Park. According to Javier Pulgar Vidal, the district includes the altitudinal Quechua, Suni or Jalca and Janca, and its elevation ranges from 2,800 meters in Upakasha, to 6,173 meters in the mountain Copa North. Chacas center is in the Quechua zone, where wheat ( Triticum spp.) and other cereals are grown.

It is bordered to the northwest, west and southwest by the Carhuaz Province, to the north by the Acochaca District, to the northeast and east by the Carlos Fermín Fitzcarrald Province and to the southeast by the Huari Province.

Terrain 
The town Chacas is located on a plateau consisting mostly of undulating dacite, rising from its lowest point in the town of Chucpin to 3000 m to 3560 m above sea level in Cochas. The terrain around this plateau, as in the province, is very rugged and mountainous. The terrain elevations are higher up on the west bank of the district to share the White Mountains with Carhuaz. The highest peaks are the Perlilla (5,586 m), located to the south east, Wakuy with 4,702 meters to the west and Copa (6,173 m).

Hydrography  
The district hydrographic network consists of a set of rivers and streams that wash many geographical areas, and completing a map of water resources for the district, both for human consumption and for irrigation. As for the rivers, there are two main running through the district from south to north: The Gun River, which rises on the slopes of Perlilla S, and Chakapata river, which rises on the slopes of the Ulta W. These channels are fed by 35 streams along its route to its junction Puruytumaq where the river takes the name of Aquchaka.

The most important streams are used by towns to ensure water supplies for irrigation and human consumption are: to the east, Rayan, west and south the Camchas the Juitush.

The district has 32 lakes, only one has been dammed for the purpose of human consumption, Patarqucha.
The major gaps are: Libron and Cancaraca west, south, and Patarqucha Pagarisha, east Wakuyqucha and Ventanilla.

Climate 
The district area has a diverse range of microclimate. These will vary according to altitude, latitude and other factors. Because of its location (puna low) and being close to tropical, presents a stark contrast of temperatures 24 hours a day. For example, on a clear day (July) temperatures range between 10 ° and 30 °Celsius, while night temperatures range from -3 ° to 10 °Celsius.

History

Beginnings 
According to the theory of Julio C. Tello, the first settlers of this region were the Waris, from Central America arrived by way of the jungle and populated the South American continent.

Chavin influence 
There is evidence that Chavín has been the cultural center of Wari in the north, as was Tiwanaku in the south. Therefore, the Chavin culture in those times influenced throughout Ancash.
The disintegration of the powerful Wari empire, different nations united by raza, language, customs, religion, organized themselves into kingdoms was a time of war between these groups, which turned into surrender in small towns to large estates, so formed the nation of the Conchucos, composed of numerous tribes in the territory now occupied by the provinces Huari, Antonio Raimondi, Fitzcarraldo, Asunción, Pomabamba, Mariscal Luzuriaga, Sihuas, Corongo, Pallasca.

Presence and cultural Pashash 
Between the years 100 to 1000 AD, Pashash culture developed in the northern Sierra de Ancash (Cabana) and projected towards the center and south of the same department. It is called Recuay culture (Pashash-Recuay) the late development of Pashash culture (500-1000 AD), it is noteworthy that before being hit by Pashash-Recuay, already living in those places small agricultural towns of rural life and manufacturing ceramics simple.

Inca Period 
Between the years 1000 to 1470 was the time of the stately formations late late or regional states, which also had demonstrations in the territories of the province Asunción today.
Chacas (provincial capital) was one of the lordships of the kingdom of Conchucos (on the eastern slopes of the Cordillera Blanca), which flourished until the Inca domination.
Inca domination was between 1460 and 1533. The kingdoms of Huaylas (western slope of the Cordillera Blanca) and were incorporated into Tawantinsuyu Conchucos, after a bloody invasion of the Inca Pachacuti, mission fulfilled his brother, General Qhapaq Yupanqui. That process of domination was incomplete, though it lasted 80 years, the Spanish set foot on this REGON when cuzqueñización process still was not finished. For this reason the Inca institutions not lay deep roots in the soil conchucano as illustrated by the Fr. Santiago Márquez.
The abundance of pirushtus, which are defensive constructions parte4s raised in the higher hills, witnessed by the existence of antagonistic groups living and warring between themselves.
There is evidence that the Incas failed to fully impose their culture, which explains differences in custom, religion and language of Ancash with respect to Cuzco.

Colonial Period 

The people of the eastern highlands of Ancash would have submitted, with little resistance to the invaders, in order to get rid of the Incas.

Chacas Foundation

The first Spanish settlement, which was an Indian Reduction was founded between 1575 and 1578 approximately. They found was standard in the cities of the colonized territories imposing the place name, the name of a saint, under whose protection and devotion by the foundation. He was appointed  Reducción Indigena de San Martin I Papa de Chacas, and that these lands belonged to the realm of Native Chagas, of those who come from other lineages: Janampa, Llashaq, Mallki, Rupay and Waraq.

The foundation of this reduction is attributed to Indian evangelists Augustinians, they arrived with Spanish and Creole families began to settle around the chapel of Pope St. Martin I to exploit mineral deposits in the surrounding areas.

Probably the official founding of the town were the Augustinian religious Hernan Garcia and Alfonso Espinoza.

When Toribio of Mogrovejo visited the town of Chacas for the second time in 1594, he assigned a stable tributary population of 154 natives and, as the head of doctrine, a population of 552 natives. This appears in two of the pages written by the clerk Hernando de Mori during his stay in the town of San Luis, which were later attached to the diary of the second visit of the archbishop.

f. 110 ... the same way the Indians gave the people of the next memory Chacas: 154 tributary Indians, 33 Indians reserved, 298 confession, 552 animas between small and large, as it seems and has all the memory that relationship.

f. 108v ... In the villages and parts are referred to two doctrines and put them two priests in the following form, in the village of Chacas and in the mill of the lawyer Diego Alvarez and Juan Melgarejo's stay is a priest with the synod and salary following: the mill tested three hundred pesos.

... There are cures for these two doctrines Fr. Francisco Diaz de Lugo, who is in San Luis, and Martin Perez in the mill and the town of Chacas.

During the viceroyalty, Chacas first belonged to the Archbishopric of Lima since 1774 from step to the jurisdiction of the commissariat of Tarma.

He became an outstanding thanks to mining center in the hills surrounding were discovered rich veins of silver that soon were worked by the Spanish and immigrants from other countries as evidenced by the different mills whose ruins remain today showing ditches characteristics and stone mills, these mills or mills were major:

San José de Mushuqmarka: Founded in 1716, it was the largest mill of the present territory of Asunción for 60 years, owned by Captain Juan Tafur mining of Cordova, which operated mines of Caxavilca, Kellayruna, Chucpin, Huiro and others founded the chaplaincy of Mushuqmarka in 1718, before Don Gabriel Mechado de Castro, chief justice and lieutenant-general of the Province of Conchucos, awarding of the said goods grinding mill metals to their alfalfa and grain mill mol.

Because of its importance, the mill was visited by several officials of the viceroyalty during operation, in 1739, after the death of John Tafur, the Commissioner of the Inquisition and General of Cavalry of the then province of Conchucos Aciego Miguel Gonzales of the visit on behalf of the Royal Audience of Lima to conduct any investigation in between the heirs in 1743, the mayor, general and Justice High Felipe Osorio de Los Rios, ingenuity comes to inventory, property and give possession of the chaplaincy to Don Joaquin de la Cerna, in 1763, the captain general, mayor, chief justice, judge of goods and departed, mayor of mines and records of the province of Conchucos, Juan de Leon and Mendoza arrives to comply will among other things relating to the construction of the altarpiece in Chacas, livestock in the highlands of Juitush and their land in Chacabamba and Chucpín.

Ingenio of Virgin of the Immaculate Conception of Tumac:  Owned by mining azoguero Claudio Mosquera, whose descendants acquired property Francisco Giron de Cabrera and whose possession is effective for real provision mandate in 1715 with the obligation to work and pay the royal fifths His Majesty the King.

Ingenio of Santa Catalina with Huancachay: Owned mining Sergeant Don Miguel Rincon Rodriguez and exploiting mine and San Antonio Huamana of Apash. This mill was operational until the Republican era, as Antonio Raimondi visited him in 1860. Included in its work and its mineral riches Ancash (1870)

There are also signs of other mills that were located in the Ruriqucha gorge, which were treated minerals: Punta Diamante and Santa Barbara. This corresponds Estapé mining boom Chacas temple, which was declared National Historical Monument 9373 by act of Congress of September 15, 1941.

The chronicles of the time reflected the diverse testimony concerning Chacas received visits by officials of the viceregal government:

 In 1750, the Captain horses Felipe Gonzales de Cossio, sub-delegate for the hearing judge, land sale and composition of the province Huaylas and conchucos and whose initiative belongs much of the territorial limits currently in effect.
 In 1773, holds the post of mayor and chief justice of the province of Conchucos Don Jose Taboada y Castillo, Colonel of the Regiment of Dragoons of Chacas.
 In 1775 the Spanish nobleman Don Antonio Navarro Dosal married by citizen chacasina Manuel Menendez taking up residence in Chacas and was appointed Postmaster of the Provinces of Carlos F. Fitzcarrald, Huari and Asunción.

The 17th and 18th centuries meant the consolidation and growth of the rule of Spain in Peru, but also its decline. The province does not escape this study context. The decline was not due to depletion of the mineral wealth of our territory, main economic activity of the Spanish in these lands. But, rather, the extermination of the native population, through the mita forced labor system in the mines, mills and encomiendas.

Obligations imposed parallel to the Indians for the benefit of the commissioners and magistrates. All this contributed to the gradual settlement of Indigenous peoples and its social organization ayllus and during the years of entire families.

Independence 
In 1780, the people of Piscobamba and Chacas staged rebellions, motivated by the ominous mandatory taxes that the Indians had to pay, in addition to the abuses of the chiefs and magistrates. Social movements were foreshadowing the colonial crisis and the advent of the Republic.
Between 1819 and 1820, people continued to react and continued turmoil. The envoy, Saint Martin, Governor - Don Dionisio Vizcarra, swore independence in the main square of all the peoples of conchucos (starting with the people of Chacas). The people of Chacas supported with livestock and food for the support of the independence cause of liberating army.

Republican period 
It was only after three decades of independence, giving rise to another historical period and readjustment of the population, until in 1853 the peace was interrupted by a tragedy of major proportions. The region and specifically the people of Chacas suffered the onset of epidemic typhus, spread around the Callejón de Huaylas, reaching Corongo. The people of Chacas part of the province of Huari, created in 1834. The year was 1983, which raises the new province of Asunción in two districts: Chaco (provincial capital) and the District of Acochaca (Law No. 23 764)

Museum 

The Museo de Sitio (museum) is in the Plaza de Armas of Chacas, where artifacts are collected and sorted, which include the remains of stone sculpture and pottery found in different parts of the province. The collection of ceramics, sculpture and other ancient artifacts had been gathered by the Provincial Municipality of Asunción (1997). Contains approximately 400 pieces, this is considered one of the largest Ancash. Chacas Museum is emerging as a cultural institution that brings alive the ancient culture and encourages tourism Chacas.

Legend 

They say that the first people of Chacas was located at a place called Mushoj Brand (small town), a more or less than 2 miles from the present town, founded by the Spanish. The Virgin knew that later was to have a great and solemn festival, and people would be in danger due to the proximity of Mushoj mark to the torrents of the river Chucpin would be easily consumed by the effects of drink and disappear for a moment torrentes.Al forth between people over the years continued to grow and with it the dangers of living along a river, so the Virgin decided to seek a better place to welcome the faithful. Ashu call an old lady who lived on a plateau a mile from Mushoj Brand was given the surprise one morning strangely lukewarm among kenuales, kisuares bunch grass and is a beautiful lady She cleansed skin almost glowing snowy and delicate hands with a child on your lap, beside a small lake, the beautiful lady said that he wanted to build their temple at that place, every morning the virgin departed for the small lake after passing through the crops of wheat and potato, took a short break in the rise of Chucpin, at a place called Mamita Hamana (¨ where the Virgin sat ¨), at dusk each day, the Virgin was found in the lake for the residents of Mushoj Brand after learning by Ashu through the virgin pastorsita wanted a temple at that place, drained the small lake on his bed, laid the foundation for the temple, naming the end, Mama Ashu the Virgin in honor Ashu perhaps the shepherd.

Operation Mato Grosso 

The founder of Operation Mato Grosso is Fr. Hugo Censi, true architect of this humanitarian work.

The life of Fr. Hugo and his sacrifice was intense, therefore he was given a lot of affection and is an example that affects many young people who want to follow. There is already more than 2,500 volunteers in Italy and 300 permanent volunteers in South America.

Contributors

The whole movement is based on two pillars:

 A group of volunteers based in South America, who are already over 300, which develops educational level tasks and selfless help to the neediest of the place.
 Groups of volunteers to help from their country of origin. The partners take actions to raise funds and school supplies to be sent to areas where volunteers do their work.

The origin of the organization is Italian and, indeed, Italy offers the greatest strength of employees once they reach a number higher than 2,500.

In Spain, in 2002, created a partnership formed by two small groups of collaborators, one in Madrid and one in Puerto Hurraco (Badajoz), who claim to be the seed of a greater force to bring prosperity to get the most impoverished South.

Father Ugo de Censi 
It is difficult to describe in words Fr. Ugo De Censi. It is difficult to understand, only words, his love, his devotion, his total dedication to the young and the poor, then try to talk about it for one of his letters.

"When I go among the poor of Peru, asked the Bishop of Huari assign me a parish located in one of the more remote valleys of the Andes. He told me and Yanama Chacas, located in the heart of the Cordillera Blanca, half of 3000 and 4000 meters, at the foot of Huascaran and Huandoy massif. Thus, the mountains that surround my life. For my people, the mountains are "nice" if you give the grass and wood, while the glaciers and snowfields just remind them of hunger and cold. In the past 30 years, things have changed a lot in the mountains. From the slopes, where they grow potatoes and cereals, they have seen strangers go with backpacks and colorful clothes.''
What do you look them in the mountains? What is it that draws them there? Many of these newcomers are careful not to trample the flowers, but spend without worrying about poverty and traditions of these people. They often do not even understand who the people living in the foothills of the mountains they climb. With the eyes of poor farmers look at these new "Pathfinder" ... I understand, because I love the mountain too, but here they talk about the opening of new routes to the summits. Can not they help open the way also for my young sons of farmers who are forced to migrate to Lima just to earn their daily bread? "

Mama Ashu 
The sanctuary has the classic double bell structure, with fine carving and stained glass door at the top of the facade. Inside are the doors, windows and seats carved wood decorated with angels and stained glass. In the background is seen the altarpiece made of cedar imported from Nicaragua, baroque bathed in gold leaf, built between 1690-1695 and found National Historic Landmark by an Act of Congress of the Republic of Peru 15, 9373 September 1941.

Tourism 

Sightseeing in the city of Chacas

Square - Chacas Museum - Shrine-Parish Mama Ashu Chacas - Mamita Lourdes - Cooperative Huanunga-Don Bosco - Stable Lluitsupananga.

Chacas adventure sports in and around.

 Canyoning: The Mommy cataract and Huallin Lourdes.
 Rock Climbing and Rappelling: The rock walls of Cuncashgaga
 Canoeing: Rio Chucpin
 Bike fall: from cars to Chucpin
 Kayak: In the rivers and Weapon Chacapata
 Paragliding: From Huaraspampa to Huanunga
 Ski and Snowboard: Perlilla mountain

Folklore

Dances 
The types of dance practiced in the province are varied, here are some:
 Anti (Antiruna)
 Corpus Dance Dance or Porter (declared a National Cultural Heritage)
 Shaqsha
 Wari
 Paso Wankillas
 Palla
 Bold
 Atawallpa
 Pizarros
 Llallu.

Celebrations

Festivities in honor of Mama Ashu 
The main festival is the August 15 for "Mama Ashu" (cult devoted to Virgin of the Assumption).

References

External links

 Portal de la Municipalidad de Chacas
 Padre Ugo De Censi
 Crónicas Chacasinas

Populated places in the Ancash Region